Thomas James Foley (1847 in Chicago – January 4, 1896 in LaGrange, Illinois) was a professional baseball player who was an outfielder in the Major Leagues in 1871.  He played for the Chicago White Stockings.

External links

19th-century baseball players
Major League Baseball outfielders
Rockford Forest Citys (NABBP) players
Chicago White Stockings players
1847 births
1896 deaths
Baseball players from Chicago